Coleophora byrsostola is a moth of the family Coleophoridae. It is found in western and south-western India (Mahableshwar in Maharashtra and Kodagu district in Karnataka.

The head and antennae are whitish-ochreous. The palpi and thorax are greyish-ochreous. The forewings are greyish-ochreous, although the second discal stigma is dark fuscous. The hindwings are light grey.

The larvae feed on Strobilanthes species. They mine the leaves of their host plant. The mine consists of a blotch which can be found in December. There are often several blotches in one leaf. Pupation takes place within the blotch in a compact oval opaque capsule, which usually drops out as the mined portion of leaf withers.

References

byrsostola
Moths described in 1931
Moths of Asia